Joseph Christopher Day (born May 11, 1968) is an American retired ice hockey center, most notably for the Springfield Indians of the American Hockey League and the Las Vegas Thunder of the International Hockey League. He played in the National Hockey League for the Hartford Whalers and New York Islanders. He also represented the United States at the 1988 World Junior Ice Hockey Championships.

Career statistics

Awards and honors

External links

http://www.eliteprospects.com/player.php?player=70126

1968 births
American men's ice hockey centers
Baltimore Bandits players
Detroit Vipers players
Hartford Whalers draft picks
Hartford Whalers players
Las Vegas Thunder players
Living people
Muskegon Fury players
New York Islanders players
Pensacola Ice Pilots players
Ice hockey people from Chicago
Salt Lake Golden Eagles (IHL) players
Springfield Indians players
St. Lawrence Saints men's ice hockey players